Asembo is a location in Kenya's Siaya County. It lies on Lake Victoria, close to the Winam Gulf. A small road connects it to the C28 highway. The bay, Asembo Bay, shares the name of the town and was once a significant port. The Asembo Bay Life Center is active in the area with humanitarian assistance.

References 

Populated places in Nyanza Province